Wyatt Hall or Wyatt House may refer to:

Wyatt House (Desha, Arkansas), listed on the NRHP in Arkansas
W. R. and Louisa E. Wyatt House, Lewiston, Idaho, listed on the NRHP in Idaho
George Wyatt House, Somerville, Massachusetts, NRHP-listed
Samuel Wyatt House, Dover, New Hampshire, NRHP-listed
Leonidas R. Wyatt House, Raleigh, North Carolina, listed on the NRHP in North Carolina
W. W. Wyatt House, Enterprise, Mississippi, listed on the NRHP in Mississippi
Wyatt Hall (Chattanooga, Tennessee), listed on the NRHP in Tennessee
Wyatt Hall (Franklin, Tennessee), NRHP-listed
Wyatt-Hickie Ranch Complex, Stephenville, Texas, listed on the NRHP in Texas
Arthur D. and Emma J. Wyatt House, Brattleboro, Vermont, listed on the NRHP in Vermont
Penn-Wyatt House, Danville, Virginia, NRHP-listed
Wyatt Hall (actor), a voice actor